Gumala  may refer to:

 Gumāla, another name for Gonbaleh, a village in Iran
 Gumala, the official name of HD 179949, a star in the constellation Sagittarius